Edward Quinn (1920–1997) was born in Ireland. He lived and worked as a photographer from the 1950s, on the Côte d'Azur, during the "golden fifties" the playground of the celebrities from the world of show biz, art and business.

The rich and the famous came to the French Riviera to relax. But the movie stars knew how much their off-screen image counted; Quinn was at the right place at the right time, making spontaneous images which caught their charm, sophistication and chic. Amongst celebrities and stars captured on film by Quinn were Grace Kelly, Brigitte Bardot, Marlon Brando, Sophia Loren, Aristotle Onassis, Maria Callas, Winston Churchill, and Somerset Maugham.

In 1951 Edward Quinn met and photographed Pablo Picasso for the first time. Their friendship lasted until Picasso's death in 1973. This encounter with Picasso was to be greatly influential to Quinn himself and to his subsequent work. Quinn is the author of several books and films about Picasso.

Since the 1960s Quinn concentrated his work on artists, amongst them Max Ernst, Alexander Calder, Francis Bacon, Salvador Dalí, Graham Sutherland, David Hockney.

In the late 1980s an intense relationship, similar to his friendship with Picasso, linked Quinn to Georg Baselitz.

From 1992 until his death in 1997, Edward Quinn lived near Zürich with his Swiss wife Gret, who died in 2011. Quinn's nephew Wolfgang Frei now manages the extensive photo archive and founded the Edward Quinn Archive Ltd.

Exhibitions 
 2020: Von Picasso bis Hockney. Edward Quinn. Künstlerfotograf. Stadtturmgalerie Gmünd/A
 2019: Picasso. L'altra meta del cielo. Museo Mediceo di Palazzo Medici Riccardi, Firenze
 2019: Picasso e la fotografia. Le fotografie di Edward Quinn, 1951-1973. Palazzo Merulana, Roma
 2019: Monaco, 6 May 1955. Photos by Edward Quinn of the first meeting of Grace Kelly and Prince Rainier. Palace of Monaco
 2019: Picasso to Hockney. Edward Quinn, Photographer of Artists. ArteF Gallery, Zurich
 2018: Picasso - Ritratto intimo. Foto di Edward Quinn. Palazzo Buffalini - Piazza Duomo. Spoleto/Italia
 2018: Picasso. La scultura. Galleria Borghese, Roma. With photographs of Picasso's sculpture studio by Edward Quinn.
 2018: Edward Quinn – Riviera Cocktail. Leica Galerie Salzburg 
 2018: Picasso/Dominguin – une amitié. With 26 Photographs by Edward Quinn. Musée des Cultures Taurines, Nîmes  
 2018: My Friend Picasso: 125 Photographs by Edward Quinn. Castletown House, Kildare, near Dublin, Ireland
 2018: Picasso e l'altra metà del cielo. With 80 Photographs by Edward Quinn. Apulia/Italy: Palazzo Tanzarella Ostuni 
 2018: Edward Quinn – Mein Freund Picasso. 125 selten ausgestellte Fotografien. Kunstmuseum Picasso, Münster 
 2018: Des Animaux et des Stars – Stars and Pets. Musée de la Gendarmerie et du Cinéma, Saint-Tropez
 2017: Edward Quinn - My Friend Picasso, Danubiana Meulensteen Art Museum, Bratislava: 125 Photos by Edward Quinn
 2017: Picasso and Maya. Father and Daughter. Gagosian Gallery. With 42 photos by Edward Quinn. (Group Exhibition)
 2017: Picasso sans cliché. Photographies d’Edward Quinn, Musée Picasso Antibes
 2016: Picasso's Picassos. Gagosian, Madison Av., New York (Group Exhibition)
 2016: Picasso, Regards croisés (Picasso, Fresh Perspectives), Château Palmer, Margaux, France
 2016: Edward Quinn - Stars & Cars, ArteF - Galerie für Kunstfotografie, Zurich
 2016: Pablo Picasso, Légende de l’art, Picasso Ceramics and 83 Edward Quinn Photos, Saint-Tropez, Salle Jean Despas 
 2016: Picasso In China. Riverside Art Museum Beijing. 
 2016: Picasso. Fenster zur Welt, Bucerius Kunstforum, Hamburg. (Group Exhibition)
 2015: Picasso in the Studio, Cahiers d’art, Paris. (Group Exhibition)
 2014: The Legend of Art, Picasso Exhibition, Shanghai, China
 2014: Picasso and the Camera, Curated By John Richardson. Gagosian Gallery New York. (Group Exhibition).
 2014: Grace Kelly, Princess and Style Icon, Paleis Het Loo, Apeldoorn Nl (Group Exhibition)
 2014: Edward Quinn: Stars in Cannes, Reygers Galerie für Photographie. Munich 
 2014: Edward Quinn. Celebrity Pets, Photography Monika Mohr Galerie. Hamburg
 2014: Picasso: Ich sehe die Dinge In anderer Art. Grafische Werke Sammlung Boisserée. (Group Exhibition). Galerie Boisserée, Köln und Galerie Reithalle Paderborn
 2014: Sylvette, Sylvette, Sylvette. Picasso Und Das Modell. (Group Exhibition). Kunsthalle Bremen
 2013: Monaco fête Picasso. Picasso Côte d'Azur. (Group exhibition). Grimaldi Forum Monaco
 2013: Pablo Picasso: Arbeiten auf Papier. Edward Quinn Fotografien. Galerie des 20. Jahrhunderts, Basel
 2012: Edward Quinn. Pablo Picasso. Photography Monika Mohr Galerie, Hamburg, Germany
 2012: Ich und Ich und Ich. Photo Portraits of Picasso. (Group Exhibition). Museum für Kunst und Gewerbe, Hamburg, Germany
 2012: Conmigo, Yo Mismo, Yo. Museo Picasso Malaga. Retratos fotográficos de Pablo Picasso. (Group Exhibition).
 2011: MeMyselfandI (Ich und Ich und Ich). Photo Portraits of Picasso. (Group Exhibition). Museum Ludwig, Köln
 2010: Edward Quinn – Riviera Cocktail. Leica Galerie Frankfurt. Rahn Foto & Fine Art
 2010: The Picasso Story. Humboldt Carrée, Berlin
 2009: Edward Quinn: Stars and Cars. ZeitHaus, Autostadt Wolfsburg.
 2009: Le Geste Picasso. (Group Exhibition). La Galerie d'art du Conseil Général des Bouches du Rhône, Aix en Provence.
 2009: Stars and Cars von Edward Quinn. Reygers Galerie für Photographie. Munich
 2009: Edward Quinn, Stars and Cars of the ‚50s. Photography Monika Mohr Galerie. Hamburg.
 2009: Pablo Picasso - Kreativität und Schaffensfreude. Clemens-Sels-Museum, Neuss/Germany
 2008: GOLDEN FIFTIES - Photographien von Edward Quinn. Kunst im Palais am Lenbachplatz, Credit Suisse, Munich
 2008: Pigozzi and the Paparazzi with Salomon, Weegee, Galella and Quinn. (Group Exhibition). Museum für Fotografie (Berlin)
 2008: Edward Quinn. Riviera Cocktail. Suite 59, Maastricht/NL 2008
 2008: Edward Quinn - Riviera Cocktail. Ludwig Museum, Koblenz/Germany
 2008: Picasso & Women. (Group Exhibition). Arken Museum, DK
 2007: Edward Quinn – The Rich and Famous. Vintage and Later Prints. Galerie Boisserée, Köln.
 2007: Ikonen der Leinwand. (Group Exhibition). Ernst Barlach Museum, Wedel, Germany
 2007: Edward Quinn. A day’s work. Vintage Prints. Michael Hoppen Gallery, London
 2007: Edward Quinn and Picasso, Paintings and Photos. Galerie Pels-Leusden, Zurich,
 2007: Edward Quinn - The Rich and Famous - Vintages und Later Prints, Ausstellung vom 12. September bis zum 13. Oktober 2007 im Stadtmuseum in Köln
 2006: Edward Quinn - Riviera Cocktail. Galerie Abbt Projects, Zurich
 2006: Edward Quinn. Photographing Hollywood during the golden Fifties on the French Riviera. Scalo Guye Gallery, Los Angeles
 2006: Edward Quinn, Riviera Cocktail. Die 50er Jahre an der Côte d’Azur. Photography Monika Mohr Galerie, Hamburg, Germany
 2000: Edward Quinn. Stars, Stars, Stars. Festival de Télévision de Monte Carlo, Monaco
 1999: Pablo Picasso – Der Reiz der Fläche. (Group Exhibition). Staatliches Museum Schwerin
 1998: La Guerre et la Paix. (Group Exhibition). Musée National Picasso de Vallauris
 1998: Edward Quinn. Stars und Sternchen. Prinz Max Palais, Karlsruhe
 1998: Hollywood Personalities 1951-1965. PaceWildensteinMacGill. Beverly Hills, California
 1998: Edward Quinn. The Charm of Portraits. Celebrities and ArtistsScalo Gallery, New York
 1998: Edward Quinn, Künstlerphotograph. Bahnhof Rolandseck, Rolandseck
 1997: Perpetual Emotion: An Affair with the Car in Pictures. (Group Exhibition). Conolly Ltd., London
 1997: Edward Quinn. La Côte d’Azur des Stars. Musée d’Art Moderne et Contemporain, Nice
 1997: Künstlerporträts. Galerie Stephan Röpke, Köln
 1997: Edward Quinn: Stars und Sternchen. Josef Albers Museum, Bottrop
 996: Edward Quinn. Gesamtwerk. Prinz Max Palais, Karlsruhe
 1996: Edward Quinn. Stars, Stars, Stars. Conolly, London
 1996: Edward Quinn. Stars der fünfziger und sechziger Jahre. Scalo, Zürich
 1996: Edward Quinn: Picasso. Museum der bildenden Künste, Leipzig
 1995: Edward Quinn. Picasso live. Quadrat Studio-Galerie, Bottrop
 1994-1995: Edward Quinn Photographs. Sotheby’s Zürich
 1994: Edward Quinn. Picasso live. Prinz Max Palais, Karlsruhe
 1994: Edward Quinn. A Côte d’Azur Album. Museum für Gestaltung, Zürich

Literature 
 Monaco Motor Racing. Delius Klasing, Bielefeld 2022
 Mein Freund Picasso. Wienand, Köln 2018
 Picasso sans cliché. Hazan, Paris 2017
 Celebrity Pets. teNeues 2014
 Stars and Cars of the'50s. teNeues 2008
 Riviera Cocktail. teNeues 2007
 Stars, Stars, Stars... Off the Screen. Scalo, Zürich 1996.
 Picasso in 3D. Thames and Hudson, London 1995.
 Edward Quinn, Fotograf Nizza. Hrsg. v. Martin Heller. Scalo, Zürich 1994.
 Georg Baselitz. Eine fotografische Studie von Edward Quinn. Benteli, Bern 1993.
 Picasso. Mensch und Bild. Klett-Cotta, Stuttgart 1988.
 The Private Picasso. Edward Quinn and Pierre Daix. Stuttgart, Paris, Boston 1987.
 Picasso avec Picasso. Pierre Bordas Art XX éme 1987
 Graham Sutherland, Complete Graphic Work. Roberto Tossi, Edward Quinn. Barcelona 1978.
 Picasso. Photos 1951-1972. Barron’s, New York 1980. 
 Max Ernst. Atlantis, Zürich 1976
 James Joyce’s Dublin. Secker and Warburg, London 1974.
 Picasso at work. A photographic study. Text by Roland Penrose. New York 1964. 
 Picasso. Werk und Tage. Manesse, Zürich 1965.

Documentary film  
 Riviera Cocktail : Edward Quinn – Photographer – Nice, a film by Heinz Bütler, Switzerland, 2006

References

External links 
 Edward Quinn Archive, official website

1920 births
1997 deaths
Irish expatriates in France
Irish expatriates in Switzerland
Irish photographers